Sireethorn Leearamwat (born 4 December 1993) is a Thai pharmacist and beauty pageant titleholder who was crowned Miss International 2019. She is the first woman from Thailand to win Miss International. Prior to winning Miss International, Leearamwat was crowned Miss Thailand 2019. She is also the first titleholder to have the longest reign in Miss International history, since the upcoming contest was canceled twice.

Early life
Leearamwat was born on December 4, 1993 in Bangkok. She attended Mahidol University, where she graduated with a Bachelor of Pharmacy degree. After graduating, she began working as a pharmacist in Bangkok.

Pageantry
Leearamwat began her pageantry career in 2019, in the Miss Thailand 2019 competition. After receiving the right to represent Bangkok, she was ultimately selected as one of the representatives from Central Thailand to participate in the main competition. In Miss Thailand 2019, Leearamwat initially advanced to the top twenty, then top eight, and was ultimately crowned Miss Thailand 2019. As Miss Thailand 2019, Leearamwat received the right to represent Thailand at Miss International 2019.

Leearamwat arrived in Tokyo to compete in Miss International 2019 in October 2019. Finals night was ultimately held on 12 November 2019. Leearamwat advanced from the initial group of 83 delegates to the top fifteen, later reaching the top eight, and then ultimately being crowned the winner by outgoing titleholder Mariem Velazco of Venezuela. With her win, Leearamwat became the first Thai woman to be crowned Miss International, and the first since Bui Simon was crowned Miss Universe 1988 to win one of the Big Four international beauty pageants.

References

External links

 

1993 births
Living people
Sireethorn Leearamwat
Sireethorn Leearamwat
Miss International 2019 delegates
Miss International winners
Sireethorn Leearamwat
Sireethorn Leearamwat
Sireethorn Leearamwat